Sara Holmsten (1715–1795) was a Swedish memoirist and member of the Moravian Church.

Sara Holmsten was the daughter of a farmer in Åland, and the devastation wrought by the Russian army during the Great Nordic War reduced her to beggary. She later supported herself as a domestic and factory worker in Stockholm, before she became a member of the Moravian church in Stockholm in the 1750s, where she worked for the leading members of the congregation.

In accordance with the custom of the members of the Moravian Church at the time, she wrote her autobiography. Her autobiography from 1787 is regarded as being among the most historically interesting of contemporary Swedish works of that kind.

References
 Nordisk kvinnoliteraturhistoria.
 http://nordicwomensliterature.net/sv/writer/holmsten-sara
 http://nordicwomensliterature.net/sv/article/guds-skrivare
 Eva Hættner Aurelius: Inför lagen. Kvinnliga svenska självbiografier från Agneta Horn till Fredrika Bremer, 1996
 Arne Jarrick: Den himmelske älskaren. Herrnhutisk väckelse, vantro och sekularisering i 1700-talets Sverige, 1987

Further reading 
 

1715 births
1795 deaths
18th-century Swedish writers
18th-century Swedish women writers
People from Åland
Women memoirists